Wadi al-Nasara ( / ALA-LC: Wādī an-Naṣārá, Greek: Κοιλάδα των Χριστιανών, Koiláda ton Christianón, which both mean "Valley of Christians") is an area in western Syria, close to the Lebanese border and administratively belonging to the governorate of Homs.

Most people in the area are Greek Orthodox Christians. A large part of the valley's population comes originally from Lebanon's northern Christian villages. Their migration to the nearby valley in Syria began in the mid-19th century as a result of the Mount Lebanon Civil War.

The area of Wadi-Al Nasara is ecclesiastically under the Archdiocese of Akkar, which has its seat in Cheikh Taba, Lebanon. The current Greek-Orthodox Metropolitan of Akkar and Wadi al-Nasara and its dependencies (Safita and Tartus) is Mgr Basilius Mansour.

Touristic Attractions 
Wadi al-Nasara used to be a popular tourist site before the outbreak of the Syrian civil war. Among its touristic attractions are the Saint George's Monastery located in the town of Al-Mishtaya, the Krak des Chevaliers Crusader castle located in the village of Al-Husn and the shrine of the Lady of the Valley in Al-Nasirah.

Villages in the valley
Al-Hawash
Mizyeneh
Marmarita
Habnamrah
Anaz
al-Mishtaya
Tallah
Kafra
al-Nasirah
Mashta Azar
Ain al-Ghara
Qalatiyah 
Ain al-Barda
Zweitina
Bahzina
Ballat
Kimah
Tannurin
Ain al-Ajouz
Daghlah
Jiwar al-Afas
Muklous
Kafr Ram
Rabah, Syria
Amar al-Husn
Juwaniyat
Ain al-Raheb
Ish al-Shuha
al-Muqaabarat
al-Mazraah
Duwair al-Lin
Al-Husn

Notable people from the Valley of the Christians 

 Victor Atiyeh- American politician, former Governor of Oregon (father was from Al-Husn)
 Joseph Atiyeh- Olympic medalist, winner of Syria's first Olympic medal (born in Al-Husn)
 Mitch Daniels- American politician, former Governor of Indiana (paternal grandfather was from Qalatiyah)
 Murray Abraham- American Oscar-winning actor (father was from Muqlus)
 John X of Antioch- Greek Orthodox Patriarch of Antioch (father is from Marmarita)
 Yusuf Al-Khal- Lebanese-Syrian poet and journalist, pioneer of Arabic surrealist poetry (born in Al-Husn)
 Teri Hatcher- American actress (maternal grandfather was from Safita near Wadi al-Nasara)
 Zerefeh Bashur- first licensed female physician in the Levant (born in Safita)
Elissa- Lebanese singer (mother is from Wadi al-Nasara)
 Nadine Al Rassi- Lebanese actress (mother is from Marmarita)

See also
 Antiochian Greek Christians
 Greek Orthodox Church of Antioch
 Eastern Orthodoxy in Syria
 Eastern Orthodoxy in Lebanon

References

Valleys of Syria
Greek Orthodoxy in Syria